The Central League is one of the two baseball leagues constituting Nippon Professional Baseball in Japan.

Central League may also refer to:

Association football leagues
 The Central League - an association football league in England 
 Central Football League - an association football league in Scotland
 Central Junior Football League - an association football league in Scotland
 Campeonato Regional Centro - a defunct association football league in Spain
 Central Premier League - an association football league in New Zealand

Baseball leagues
Central League (1888)  
Central League (1897)
Central League (minor league)
Central Baseball League  
Central Interstate League
Central Illinois Collegiate League